Fagen is a surname. Notable people with the surname include:

David Fagen (1875–1901), African-American soldier 
Donald Fagen (born 1948), American musician 
Graham Fagen (born 1966), Scottish artist
Leslie Fagen, American litigator

See also
Fagan, surname
Fagin (surname)